1940 Lo Oka Gramam is a 2010 Indian Telugu-language period drama film directed by Narasimha Nandi. It stars Baladitya and Sri Ramya, with Rallapalli, Mukkuraju, Rajitha, Jenni, Vinodh and Gundu Hanumantharao in supporting roles. It is inspired by the story Nayudu Pilla written by Gudipati Venkata Chalam. The director mentions that Nayudu Pilla inspired him to develop the story. It is produced by N. C. Narasimham.

Cast 
Baladitya as Suri
Sri Ramya as Suseela 
Rallapalli
Mukku Raju as Dixitulu 
Ramakrishna
Rajitha
Gundu Hanumantharao
Vinod
Jenni

Awards and honours

References

External links 
 

2010 films
Films based on Indian novels
Films set in 1940
Best Telugu Feature Film National Film Award winners
2010s Telugu-language films
Films about social class
Films about social issues
Films about society
Films about the caste system in India
Films set in the British Raj